Buttigliera d'Asti is a comune (municipality) in the Province of Asti in the Italian region Piedmont, located about  southeast of Turin and about  northwest of Asti.

References

External links

 Official website

Cities and towns in Piedmont